Streptomyces calvus is a bacterium species from the genus of Streptomyces which has been isolated from soil in Dinepur in India. Streptomyces calvus produces nucleocidin, adiposin 1 and adiposin 2.

See also 
 List of Streptomyces species

References

Further reading

External links
Type strain of Streptomyces calvus at BacDive – the Bacterial Diversity Metadatabase

calvus
Bacteria described in 1957